Ronald A. Stott (March 4, 1938 – March 29, 2014) was an American businessman and politician.

Born in Buffalo, New York, Stott served in the United States Marine Corps. He received his bachelor's degree from University of Arizona and was one of the founders of Datacom Systems Inc. in East Syracuse, New York and was an engineer for General Electric. Stott served as Mayor of North Syracuse, New York from 1971 to 1974. He also served as a county legislator in Onondaga County, New York. Stott served in the New York Assembly, in 1975, as a Democrat.

Notes

1938 births
2014 deaths
Politicians from Buffalo, New York
People from Onondaga County, New York
Military personnel from New York (state)
University of Arizona alumni
Businesspeople from Buffalo, New York
County legislators in New York (state)
Mayors of places in New York (state)
Democratic Party members of the New York State Assembly
People from DeWitt, New York
20th-century American businesspeople